Two Pieces for Piano is a set of two pieces for piano solo composed in 1925 by John Ireland.

A performance of both pieces takes about 8 minutes. They are:

 April (5 minutes) 
 Bergomask

A bergomask is a dance and associated melody and chord progression associated with the town of Bergamo in Northern Italy.

References 

Solo piano pieces by John Ireland
1925 compositions